Bağlar may refer to:

Bağlar, Diyarbakır, Turkey
Zağulba Bağları, Azerbaijan
Bağlar, Üzümlü